Regina Blandón (born July 25, 1990) is a Mexican actress. She is known for her role as Bibi P. Luche in the sitcom, La familia P. Luche. Blandón is the daughter of actor Roberto Blandón.

Biography 
Blandón was born on July 25, 1990, and is the daughter of actor Roberto Blandón. She became popular for her role as Bibi P. Luche, the "weird" girl in the television series La familia P. Luche, working alongside comedians Eugenio Derbez and Consuelo Duval. In 2003, she debuted on film in El misterio de la Trinidad earned her the Ariel for Best Supporting Actress.

In 2013, Blandón starred as Maria, Patricia and Ana in Nacho Cano's musical Hoy No Me Puedo Levantar. In the same year, she debuted in the Canal 5 program Me caigo de risa.

In 2016, Blandón was in El hotel de los secretos as Matilde, the best friend of Irene Azuela's character, sharing credits with Erick Elías.

Blandón married comedian Roberto Flores in September 2017. However, they divorced 10 months later.

Filmography

Film roles

Television roles

Awards and nominations

References

External links

21st-century Mexican actresses
Living people
1990 births
Actresses from Mexico City
Mexican film actresses
Mexican television actresses